Subbarao or Subba Rao (Kannada: ಸುಬ್ಬ ರಾವ್), sometimes spelled SubbaRow or Subba Row, is an Indian name.

People with the name
 Adurthi Subba Rao (1912–1975), Telugu film director
 B. A. Subba Rao (fl. 1950–1987), Telugu film director and producer
 B. R. Subba Rao (1925–2020), Entomologist
 Duvvuri Subbarao (born 1949), Indian economist and central banker
 Govindarajula Subba Rao (1895–1959), Telugu theater and film actor
 I. V. Subba Rao (scientist) (1934–2010), Indian agriculturist
 Kakarla Subba Rao (1925–2021), Indian radiologist
 Kanta Subbarao, Indian virologist, molecular geneticist, and physician-scientist
 Katta Subba Rao (1940–1988), Telugu film director
 Koka Subba Rao (1902–1976), Chief Justice of the Supreme Court of India
 Mathukumalli V. Subbarao (1921–2006), Indo-Canadian mathematician
 Nanduri Venkata Subba Rao (1895–1957), Telugu poet
 Nyapati Subba Rao Pantulu (1856–1941), Indian politician and social activist
 Ponnada Subba Rao, Indian politician and lawyer.
 Raman Subba Row (born 1932), English cricketer
 Rayaprolu Subba Rao (1892–1984), Indian poet
 Tata Subba Rao (born 1942), British statistician
 Tallapragada Subba Row (1856–1890), Indian theosophist and lawyer
 Taluku Ramaswami Subba Rao (1920–1984), Kannada novelist and scholar
 Yellapragada Subbarow (1895–1948), Indian biochemist

Masculine given names